The 2021 Marshall Thundering Herd baseball team represented Marshall University in the sport of baseball for the 2021 college baseball season. The Thundering Herd competed in Division I of the National Collegiate Athletic Association (NCAA) and in Conference USA East Division. They played their home games at Kennedy Center Field in Huntington, West Virginia. The team was coached by Jeff Waggoner, who was in his fifteenth season with the Thundering Herd.

Preseason

C-USA media poll
The Conference USA preseason poll was released on February 11, 2021 with the Thundering Herd predicted to finish in last place (7th) in the East Division.

Schedule and results

Schedule Source:
*Rankings are based on the team's current ranking in the D1Baseball poll.

References

External links
•	Marshall Baseball

Marshall
Marshall Thundering Herd baseball seasons
Marshall Thundering Herd